Harris is an English-language surname with a variety of spellings.

A list of notable people sharing the surname Harris is shown here. Only the "Harris" spelling is considered here.

List of notable people with surname Harris

A
A. J. Harris (born 1984), American football player
Aaron Harris (disambiguation), multiple people
Abram Lincoln Harris (1899–1963), American economist, anthropologist, and social critic
Abram W. Harris (1858–1935), American academic
A. Brooks Harris (born 1935), American physicist
Ace Harris (1910–1964), American jazz pianist
Addie "Micki" Harris (1940–1982), American singer, member of The Shirelles
Al Harris (cornerback) (born 1974), American football player
Albert Harris (football manager), English football manager
Albert T. Harris (1915–1942), American naval officer
Alex Harris (disambiguation), multiple people
Alexander Harris (disambiguation), multiple people
Alicia K. Harris, Canadian director and screenwriter
Allan Harris (1942–2017), English footballer
Alysha Harris (born 1987), American beauty pageant titleholder
Amanda Bartlett Harris (1824–1917), American author and literary critic
Andrew Harris (disambiguation), multiple people
Angela Harris (disambiguation), multiple people
Anita Harris (born 1942), British actress, singer and entertainer
Anne Harris (author), American science fiction author
Anne Harris (journalist), Irish newspaper editor
Anne Harris (musician), American singer-songwriter
Anne Harris (sculptor), Canadian sculptor
Anthony Harris (disambiguation), multiple people
Antoine Harris (born 1982), American football player
Antwan Harris (born 1977), American football player
Arlen Harris (born 1980), American football player
Arlene Harris (1896–1976), Canadian actress
Arne Harris (1934–2001), American television producer
Art Harris (1947–2007), American basketball player
Arthur Harris (disambiguation), multiple people
Ashlyn Harris (born 1985), American footballer
Atiba Harris (born 1985), Saint Kitts and Nevis footballer
Atnaf Harris (born 1979), American football player
Augustine Harris (1917–2007), English bishop
Augustus Harris (1852–1896), English actor
Augustus Glossop Harris (1825–1873), English actor

B
Barbara Harris (disambiguation), multiple people
Barry Harris (1929–2021), American bebop jazz pianist and educator
Barry Harris (Canadian musician), dance music DJ, remixer and musician
Beaver Harris (1936–1991), American jazz drummer
Ben Harris (disambiguation), multiple people
Benjamin Harris (disambiguation), multiple people
Benny Harris (1919–1975), American musician
Bernard A. Harris Jr. (born 1956), American astronaut
Bernardo Harris (born 1971), American football player
Bert Harris (1873–1897), English cyclist
Bertha Harris (1937–2005), American novelist
Betty Harris (born 1939), American singer
Bev Harris, American writer
Bill Harris (disambiguation), multiple people
Bishop Harris, American football coach
Bo Harris (born 1988), American football player
Bob Harris (disambiguation), multiple people
Bon Harris (born 1965), English musician
Brad Harris (1933–2017), American actor
Brandon Harris, American football player
Brandon Harris (quarterback), American football player
Brendan Harris (born 1980), American baseball player
Brian Harris (disambiguation), multiple people
Bruce Harris (disambiguation), multiple people
Bubba Harris (born 1985), American BMX racer
Bubba Harris (baseball) (1926–2013), American baseball player
Bucky Harris (1896–1977), American baseball player

C
C. J. Harris (born 1991), American basketball player in the Israeli Basketball Premier League
Caleb C. Harris (1836–1904), American physician and politician
Caleel Harris (born 2003), American actor
Calvin Harris (born 1984), stage name of British singer-songwriter, DJ and producer Adam Wiles
Cal Harris (born 1962), American college lacrosse star and car dealer tried four times for the murder of his missing wife.
Candy Harris (born 1947), American baseball player
Carl Harris (born 1956), Welsh footballer
Carlyle Harris (1868–1893), American murderer
Caroline Harris (1867–1937), American actress
Carolyn Harris (b. 1960), British politician
Carolyn Lynnet Harris (1948–1994), US librarian
Carolyn Wilson Harris (1849–1910), US lichenologist
Cassandra Harris (1948–1991), Australian actress
Cecil E. Harris (1916–1981), American aviator
Chapin A. Harris (1806–1860), American dentist
Charlaine Harris (born 1951), American author
Charles Harris (disambiguation), multiple people
Charlie Harris (disambiguation), multiple people
Charlotte Harris (artist) (born 1981), English artist
Chauncy Harris (1914–2003), American geographer
Chris Harris (disambiguation), multiple people
Christian Harris (born 2001), American football player
Christie Harris (1907–2002), Canadian author
Christine Harris (disambiguation)
Christine Harris (actress) (born 1964), Australian actress
Christine Harris (author) (born 1955), Australian writer
Christopher Harris (disambiguation)
Ciara (Ciara Princess Harris, born 1985), American singer
Claire Harris (disambiguation)
Claire Harris (poet) (1937–2018), Canadian poet
Clara Harris (1845–1883), American murder victim
Clare Harris (disambiguation)
Clare Winger Harris (1891–1968), American writer
Clarence Harris (1905–1999), American witness to Greensboro sit-ins
Clark Harris (born 1984), American football player
Claude Harris, Jr. (1940–1994), American politician
Cliff Harris (born 1948), American football player
Clifford Joseph Harris, Jr. (born 1980), American rapper better known as T.I.
Cody Harris, multiple people
Cole Harris (1936–2022), Canadian geographer
Colin Harris (disambiguation), multiple people
Corey Harris (disambiguation), multiple people
Corra Mae Harris (1869–1935), American writer
Craig Harris, jazz trombonist and composer
Cristi Harris (born 1977), American actress
Curtis W. Harris (1924–2017), American politician
Cynthia Harris (1934–2021), American actress
Cyriak (Cyriak Harris), British animator
Cyril Harris (1936–2005), Scottish rabbi

D
Damon Harris (1950–2013), American soul and R&B singer
Daniel Harris (disambiguation) or Dan Harris, multiple people
Danielle Harris (born 1977), American actress
Danny Harris (born 1965), American athlete
Darius Harris (born 1996), American football player
Darren Harris (disambiguation), multiple people
Dave Harris (born 1971), American disc jockey, songwriter, and musician
David Harris (disambiguation), multiple people
Davontae Harris (born 1995), American football player
Dean Harris, British actor
Deborah Turner Harris (born 1951), American fantasy writer
De'Jon Harris (born 1997), American football player
Del Harris (born 1937), American basketball coach
Del Harris (squash player) (born 1969), English squash player
DeMichael Harris (born 1998), American football player
Demone Harris (born 1995), American football player
Dennis Harris (disambiguation), multiple people
Deonte Harris (born 1997), American football player
Devin Harris (born 1983), American basketball player
Devon Harris (born 1964), Jamaican athlete
Dickie Harris (born 1950), American CFL player
Dominique Harris (born 1987), American football player
Don Harris (1936–1978), NBC-TV correspondent
Donald J. Harris (born 1938), American economist 
Don "Sugarcane" Harris (1938–1999), American violinist
Donald Harris (born 1961), American wrestler
Doni Harris, American country musician
Duriel Harris (born 1954), American football player

E
E. Lynn Harris (1955–2009), American author
Earl Harris (cricketer) (born 1952), Saint Kitts-born former English cricketer
Earl Harris (politician) (1941–2015), Democratic member of the Indiana House of Representatives
Eddie Harris (1934–1996), American jazz musician
Eddy L. Harris, American writer
Edna Mae Harris (1910–1997), American actress
Edward Harris (disambiguation), multiple people
Eileen Harris (born 1932), English architectural historian
Elias Harris (born 1989), German basketball player
Elihu Harris, American politician
Elisha Harris (1791–1861), American politician, lieutenant governor and governor of Rhode Island
Elmer Harris (disambiguation), multiple people
Emil Harris, American police chief
Emily Harris (born 1947), member of the Symbionese Liberation Army
Emma Harris (1871–after 1940), American actress
Emma Harris (LYDP), founder of Little Yellow Duck Project
Emmylou Harris (born 1947), folk and country singer
Eoghan Harris, Irish newspaper columnist and politician
Eric Harris (1981–1999), American pizza shop manager and one of the perpetrators of the Columbine massacre
Erick Harris (born 1982), American football player
Erline Harris, American singer
Erna P. Harris (1906-1995), American journalist and businesswoman
Errol Harris (1908–2009), South African philosopher
Estelle Harris (1928–2022), American actress
Ethel Hillyer Harris (1859–1931), American author
Eva Harris, American epidemiologist
Evan Harris (born 1965), British politician

F
Flora Harris, English horse rider
Francis Harris (1908–1958), English footballer
Franco Harris (1950–2022), American football player
Frank Harris (1856–1931), Irish-American author, editor, journalist, and publisher
Frank Harris (baseball) (1858–1939), American baseball player
Franklin S. Harris (1884–1960), American missionary
Fred Harris (disambiguation), multiple people
Frederic R. Harris (1875–1949), Rear Admiral of New York City
Fredric J. Harris, American academic
Frieda Harris (1877–1962), British occultist

G
Gail Harris (born 1964), English actress
Gail Harris (baseball) (1931–2012), American baseball player
Gayle Harris, American Episcopal bishop
Gene Harris (1933–2000), American jazz musician
Gene Harris (baseball) (born 1964), American baseball player
George Harris (disambiguation), multiple people
Geraldine Harris (born 1951), British archaeologist
Gerry Harris (disambiguation), multiple people
Gilbert Harris (born 1984), American football player
Gilbert Dennison Harris (1864–1952), American geologist
Gordon Harris (disambiguation), several people
Graham Harris (born 1937), Australian politician
Graham Harris (rugby league), rugby league footballer of the 1960s
Grant Harris, American DJ
Greg Harris (disambiguation), multiple people
Gregg Harris (born 1952), American educator
Gus Harris (1908–2000), Canadian politician

H
Hamilton Harris (1820–1900), New York politician
Hank Harris, American actor
Hank Harris (American football) (1923–1999), American football player
Harold Arthur Harris (1902–1974), British classical scholar
Harriet Sansom Harris (born 1955), American actress
Harry Harris (disambiguation), multiple people
Harwell Hamilton Harris (1903–1990), American architect
Heidi Harris, American radio personality
Henry Harris (disambiguation), multiple people
Herbert Harris (1926–2014), American politician
Herman Harris (born 1953), American basketball player
Hilary Harris (1929–1999), American documentary film-maker
Holly Harris (born 2002), Australian figure skater 
Homer Harris (1916–2007), American football player
Howard Harris (writer) (1912–1986), American comedy writer
Howard Harris (wrestler) (born 1958), American wrestler
Hugh Harris (guitarist) (born 1987), British rock guitarist
Hugh Harris (ice hockey) (born 1948), Canadian ice hockey player
Hugh Harris (singer) (born 1965), English singer
Hugh P. Harris (1909–1979), American general
Hunter Harris Jr. (1909–1987), American general

I
Iestyn Harris (born 1976), British rugby league player
Ike Harris (born 1952), American football player
Ira Harris (1802–1875), American politician
Irving Harris (1910–2004), American businessman
Isham G. Harris (1818–1897), American politician, Tennessee governor and US senator
Ishwar C. Harris (born 1943), American academic
Ivan Harris (born 1984), American basketball player
Ivory Harris, American criminal

J
James Harris (solicitor) (1940–2004), British legal professional
Jack Harris (disambiguation), multiple people
Jackie Harris (born 1968), American football player
Jacob Harris (disambiguation), multiple people
Jalen Harris (born 1998), American basketball player
James Harris (disambiguation), multiple people
Jamie Harris (actor) (born 1963), British actor
Jamie Harris (footballer) (born 1979), Welsh footballer
Jana Harris (born 1947), American poet, novelist, essayist, and journal founder
Jane Harris (producer), British television director
Jared Harris (born 1961), English actor
Jason Harris (disambiguation), multiple people
Jay Harris (boxer) (born 1990), Welsh boxer
Jay Harris (footballer, born 1987), English footballer for Wrexham
Jay Harris (sportscaster) (born 1965), American journalist
Jean Harris (1923–2012), American murderer, convicted of killing Dr. Herman Tarnower
Jed Harris (1900–1979), Austrian screenwriter
Jeff Harris (disambiguation), multiple people
Jeffrey Harris (disambiguation), multiple people
Jennifer Harris, American basketball player
Jeremy Harris (born 1950), American politician
Jeremy Harris (American football) (born 1991), Canadian football player
Jeremy Harris (sailor) (born 1942), British Olympic sailor
Jerry Harris (1945–2016), American artist
Jerry Harris (scientist), American geophysicist
Jerry Harris (television personality) (born 1999), American television personality
Jesse Harris, American singer, songwriter, and guitarist
Jet Harris (1939–2011), English musician
Jill Harris, American voice actress
Jim Harris (disambiguation), multiple people
Jimmy Harris (disambiguation), multiple people
Jo Ann Harris (born 1949), American actress
Joanne Harris (born 1964), British author
Jody Harris, American musician
Joe Harris (disambiguation), multiple people
Joel Chandler Harris (1845–1908), American folklorist
John Harris (disambiguation), multiple people
Johnnie Harris (born 1972), American football player
Jon Harris (artist), American artist
Jon Harris (baseball), American baseball player
Jonathan Harris (disambiguation), multiple people
Jordan Harris (born 2000), American ice hockey player
Joseph Harris (disambiguation), multiple people
Josh Harris (disambiguation), multiple people
Joshua Harris (author) (born 1974), American author and former pastor
Josiah A. Harris (1808–1876), American politician
J. Rendel Harris (1852–1941), English biblical scholar
Judith Rich Harris (1938–2018), American psychologist and author
Julie Harris (actress) (1925–2013), American actress
Julie Harris (costume designer) (1921–2015), British costume designer
Julius Harris (1923–2004), American actor

K
Kamala Harris (born 1964), American politician; 49th Vice President of the United States
Karen Harris (model), American model
Karen Harris (writer), American soap opera writer
Karen R. Harris, American educational psychologist
Karl Harris (born 1979), English motorcycle racer
Katherine Harris (born 1957), American politician, Florida Secretary of State and US representative
Katherine Safford Harris, noted psychologist and speech scientist
Kay-Jay Harris (born 1979), American football player
Keith Harris (disambiguation), multiple people
Ken Harris (1898–1982), American animator
Ken Harris (politician) (1963–2008), American politician
Kent Harris (1930–2019), American songwriter
Kevin Harris (disambiguation), multiple people
Kirk Harris, American actor
Kitty Harris, Soviet agent
Krista Harris (?–2006), Canadian producer
Krystal Harris (born 1981), American singer
Kylie Rae Harris (1989–2019), American singer-songwriter
Kwame Harris (born 1982), Jamaican NFL player

L
La'Donte Harris (born 1986), American football player
Labron Harris (1908–1995), American golfer
Labron Harris Jr. (born 1941), American golfer
LaDonna Harris (born 1931), American politician
Lagumot Harris (1938–1999), Nauruan politician
Lance Harris (born 1961), American politician
Larnelle Harris, American singer
Larry Harris (disambiguation), multiple people
Laura Harris (born 1976), Canadian actress
Lauren Harris (born 1984), British singer
Lawren Harris (1885–1970), Canadian painter
Lawrence Harris (born 1937), African American painter
Lawrence T. Harris (1873–1960), American politician
Lee Harris (disambiguation), multiple people
Lement Harris (1904–2002), American communist
Lemuel Harris (1907–1996), Canadian politician
Len Harris (politician) (born 1943), Australian politician
Lenny Harris (born 1964), American baseball player
Leo Harris (1904–1990), American football coach
Leon Harris (born 1961), American newscaster
Leon Harris (footballer) (born 1958), Australian rules footballer
Leonard Harris (disambiguation), multiple people
Leonore Harris (1879–1953), American actress
Leotis Harris (born 1955), American football player
Leroy Harris (disambiguation), multiple people
Leslie Harris (director), American film director
Lewis Harris (disambiguation), multiple people
Lis Harris, American journalist
Lloyd Harris (tennis) (born 1997), South African tennis player
Louis Harris (1921–2016), American journalist
Louise Harris, Australian actress
Louise "Mamma" Harris, American labor organizer
Lucious Harris (born 1970), American basketball player
Lucy Harris (1792–1836), American Mormon, wife of Martin Harris (Latter Day Saints)
Lum Harris (1915–1996), American baseball pitcher, coach, manager, and scout
Lusia Harris (1955–2022), American basketball player

M
M. L. Harris (born 1954), American football player
Macho Harris (born 1986), American football player
Madeleine Harris (born 2001), British actress
Major Harris (American football), American football player
Major Harris (singer) (1947–2012), American R&B singer
Marcelite J. Harris (1943–2018), American general
Marcell Harris (born 1994), American football player
Marcus Harris (disambiguation), multiple people
Margaret Harris (1904–2000), English costume designer
Marilyn Harris (actress) (1924–1999), American actress
Marilyn Harris (writer) (1931–2002), American author
Marion Harris (1896–1944), American singer
Marjorie Harris (born 1937), Canadian writer
Marjorie Silliman Harris (1890–1976), American philosopher
Mark Harris (disambiguation), multiple people
Marques Harris (born 1981), American football player
Marsha Harris, American basketball player
Martin Harris (disambiguation), multiple people
Marvin Harris (1927–2001), American anthropologist
Mary Harris Jones (1830–1930), better known as Mother Jones, American activist
Mary Johnson Harris, American educator
Mary Packer Harris (1891–1978) artist and art teacher in South Australia
Mary Styles Harris (born 1949), American geneticist
Matthew Harris (Irish politician) (1826–1890)
Maurice Harris (born 1976), American boxer
Maurice H. Harris (1859–1930), English-American rabbi
Max Harris (composer) (1918–2004), British television music composer and arranger
Max Harris (golfer) (born 1978), British golfer
Max Harris (poet) (1921–1995), Australian poet
Maya Harris, American activist
Mel Harris (born 1956), American actress
Merriman Colbert Harris (1846–1921), American missionary
Michael Harris (disambiguation), multiple people
Michele Anne Harris (born 1965), American woman missing since 2001
Mick Harris, British musician
Mickey Harris (1917–1971), American baseball player
Mildred Harris (1901–1944), American actress
Mildred M. Harris (died 1974), American politician
Milton Harris (disambiguation), multiple people
Miriam Coles Harris (1834–1925), American novelist
Mitch Harris (born 1970), American guitarist
Moira Harris (born 1954), American actress
Moose Harris (born 1967), British bass guitarist
Moses Harris (1731–1785), English entomologist and engraver
Moses Harris (mountain man) (1800–1850), the American guide, scout, and trapper
Moses Harris (soldier), the United States Army soldier and Medal of Honor recipient

N
Najee Harris (born 1998), American football player
Naomie Harris (born 1976), English actress
Napoleon Harris (born 1979), American football player
Narrelle Harris, American author
Nate Harris (born 1983), American football player
Nathaniel Edwin Harris (1846–1929), American lawyer and governor of Georgia
Neil Harris (disambiguation), multiple people
Neil Patrick Harris (born June 15, 1973), American actor, singer, director and magician
Nelson Harris, mayor of Roanoke, Virginia
Nick Harris (disambiguation), multiple people
Nigel Harris (disambiguation), multiple people
Nikki Harris (born 1986), English cyclist
Norman Harris (disambiguation), multiple people

O
Odie Harris (born 1966), American football player
Oliver Harris, British academic
Harris (rapper) (Oliver Harris, born 1976), German rapper
Oren Harris (1903–1997), American politician
Orien Harris (born 1983), American football player
Orland Harris (1932−2021), member of the Texas Legislature
Oscar Harris (born 1943), Surinamese born Dutch musician
Oscar N. Harris (1939–2020), American businessman and politician
Otis Harris (born 1982), American athlete

P
Pasty Harris (born 1944), English cricketer
Patience Harris (1857–1901), British costume designer
Patricia Harris (born 1956), American politician
Patricia Roberts Harris (1924–1985), American politician
Paul Harris (disambiguation), multiple people
Percy Harris (Sir Percy Harris, 1st Baronet, 1876–1952), British politician
Pep Harris (born 1972), American baseball player
Peppermint Harris (1925–1999), American singer
Peter Harris (disambiguation), multiple people
Phil Harris (1904–1995), American singer, songwriter, jazz musician, actor and comedian
Phil Harris (fisherman) (1956–2010), American fishing boat captain and reality television personality
Philip Harris, Baron Harris of Peckham (born 1942), British politician and businessman
Polly Harris (1924–1987), American politician
Preben Harris (born 1935), Danish actor

Q
Quentin Harris (American football) (born 1977), American football player

R
R. H. Harris (1916–2000), American gospel singer
Rachael Harris (born 1968), American actress
Rachel Harris (born 1979), Australian athlete
Radie Harris (1904–2001), American columnist
Ralph Harris (disambiguation), multiple people
Ray Harris (1927–2003), singer/songwriter
Raymont Harris (born 1970), American football player
Reed Harris (1909–1982), American writer
Reg Harris (1920–1992), English cyclist
Reggie Harris (born 1968), American baseball player
Reginald L. Harris (1890–1959), American politician
Renatus Harris (1652–1724), English master organ maker
René Harris (1947–2008), former President of Nauru
Richard Harris (disambiguation)
Richard Reader Harris (barrister) (1847–1909), English barrister
Richard Reader Harris (politician) (1913–2009), British politician
Rickie Harris (born 1943), American football player
Ricky Harris (disambiguation)
Robbie Harris (born 1982), South African rugby union player
Robert Harris (disambiguation), multiple people
Robin Harris (1953–1990), American comedian
Rod Harris (born 1966), American football player
Roger Harris (disambiguation), multiple people
Rolf Harris (born 1930), Australian musician, composer, painter and television host
Ron Harris (disambiguation), multiple people
Ronan Harris (born 1966), Irish singer
Rosalind Harris, American actress
Rosemary Harris (born 1927), English actress
Rosie Harris (born 1925), English novelist
Ross Harris (actor) (born 1969), American actor, artist, and musician
Ross Harris (footballer) (born 1985), Scottish footballer
Roy Harris (1898–1979), American classical composer
Rudy Harris (born 1971), American football player
Ryan Harris (disambiguation), multiple people

S
Sam Harris (disambiguation), multiple people
Samantha Harris (born 1973), American TV presenter
Sampson Willis Harris (1809–1857), American politician
Samuel Harris (disambiguation), multiple people
Sarah Harris (disambiguation), multiple people
Scott Harris (disambiguation), multiple people
Seale Harris (1870–1957), American physician
Sean Harris (born 1972), British actor
Shakey Jake Harris (1921–1990), American blues singer, harmonicist and songwriter
Shelby Harris, American football player
Sheldon H. Harris (1928–2002), American historian
Sidney Harris (disambiguation), multiple people
Simon Harris (born 1962), British DJ
Simone Harris, Trinidadian actress
Smokey Harris (1890–1974), Canadian ice hockey player
Sophie Harris (1900–1966), English costume designer
Stefon Harris (born 1973), American jazz vibraphonist
Stephen Harris (disambiguation), multiple people
Steve Harris (disambiguation), multiple people
Steven Harris (defensive tackle) (born 1984), NFL player
Steven Harris (wide receiver) (born 1981), NFL player
Sue Harris, English musician
Sumowood Harris, Liberian clergyman
Susan Harris (disambiguation), multiple people
Sydney Harris (disambiguation), multiple people

T
Ted Harris (disambiguation), multiple people
Thaddeus William Harris (1795–1856), American entomologist and botanist
Theresa Harris (1906–1985), American actress and singer
Thomas Harris (disambiguation), multiple people
Thurston Harris (1931–1990), American singer
Tim Harris (disambiguation), multiple people
Timba Harris, American musician
Timothy Harris (born 1964), Caribbean politician
Tina Harris, American singer
Toby Harris, Baron Harris of Haringey (born 1953), British politician
Tom Harris (disambiguation), multiple people
Tomás Harris (1908–1964), British agent
Tommie Harris (born 1983), American football player
Tommy Harris (disambiguation), multiple people
Tony Harris (disambiguation), multiple people
Tora Harris (born 1978), American athlete
Townsend Harris (1804–1878), American merchant
Tracy Harris (born 1958), American artist
Trent Harris, American film maker
Trent Harris (American football) (born 1995), American football player
Trevor Boots Harris (1944/45–2014), Jamaican journalist
Trevor Harris (born 1986), American quarterback in Canadian football
Trevor Harris (footballer) (born 1936), English footballer
Tuff Harris (born 1983), American football player

V
Val Harris (1884–?), Irish footballer
Vic Harris (disambiguation), multiple people
Vincent Harris (1876–1971), English architect
Virginia Harris, American Christian Scientist
Vivian Harris (born 1978), American boxer

W
Wadsworth Harris (1864–1942), American actor
Wally Harris (disambiguation), multiple people
Walt Harris (coach) (born 1946), American football coach
Walt Harris (cornerback) (born 1974), cornerback
Walter Harris (disambiguation), multiple people
Wayne Harris (1938–2015), American football player
Wendell Harris (born 1940), American football player
Whitney Robson Harris (1912–2010), American attorney, one of the last surviving prosecutors from the Nuremberg Trials
Wil Harris (born 1982), technology writer
Will Harris (born 1984), American baseball player
Will Harris (American football) (born 1997), American football player
Wiley P. Harris (1818–1891), American politician
William Harris (disambiguation), multiple people
Willie Harris (born 1978), American baseball player
Wilson Harris (1921–2018), Guyanese writer
Winder R. Harris (1888–1974), American politician
Witarina Harris (1906–2007), New Zealand Māori film actress, language advocate, entertainer and public servant
Wolde Harris (born 1974), Jamaican footballer
Wood Harris (born 1969), American actor
Wynonie Harris (1915–1969), American blues shouter

Z
Zelda Harris (born 1985), American actress
Zellig Harris (1909–1992), American linguist
Zin Harris (1927–1991), New Zealand cricketer

Fictional characters
Harris (Porridge), character in the British TV show Porridge
Angela Harris (Coronation Street), character on Coronation Street
Beverly "Bev" Harris, character on Roseanne, played by Estelle Parsons
Chloe Harris, character on Emmerdale
Craig Harris (Coronation Street), character on Coronation Street
Dwight Harris, character on The Sopranos
Jane Harris (Neighbours), character on Neighbours
Jessica Harris (Hollyoaks), character on Hollyoaks
Joan Harris (née Holloway) (born 1931), character in the TV series Mad Men
Joey Harris, a character in the American television sitcom My Two Dads
Katy Harris, character on Coronation Street (daughter)
Corporal Kevin "Specks" Harris, character in the 2011 film Battle Los Angeles; played by Ne-Yo
Marjorie "Jackie" Harris, character on Roseanne, portrayed by Laurie Metcalf
Miles Lee Harris, the protagonist of the 2019 action comedy Guns Akimbo
Mo Harris, character on Eastenders
Nina Harris, character on Eastenders
Ron Harris (detective), character on Barney Miller
Sergeant Harris, character on Sharpe
Lt./Capt. Thaddeus Harris, stern cop of the Police Academy film series
Tommy Harris (Coronation Street), character on Coronation Street (father)
Wendy Harris, character on Super Friends cartoon
Xander Harris, character in the television series Buffy the Vampire Slayer
Zipper Harris, character in comic strip Doonesbury
Zonker Harris, character in Doonesbury

See also
Harries
Harriss
Herries

External links
Harris Y-DNA Project homepage

Lists of people by surname